Conley-Caraballo High School (CCHS), formerly El Rancho Verde High School, is a public 9-12 continuation high school in south Hayward, California, United States. It is part of the New Haven Unified School District (NHUSD), along with James Logan High School.

The school was named after Jean Conley (d. 1982) and Hector Caraballo (d. 2000). The campus opened in 2005 and was the first solar powered school in the  district.

Enrollment is around 100 students, who live in Hayward and Union City.

External links 
 School website

References

High schools in Alameda County, California
Continuation high schools in California
Educational institutions established in 2005
Education in Hayward, California
Public high schools in California
2005 establishments in California